Anton Josef Gruscha, S.T.D. (3 November 1820, Vienna – 5 August 1911, Schloss Kranichberg, Lower Austria) was a Cardinal of the Roman Catholic Church and was Archbishop of Vienna.

He was born in Vienna, Austria. He received minor orders on 31 October 1839, the subdiaconate on 9 July 1842, the diaconate 15 July 1842. He was ordained on 4 May 1843. He attended the University of Vienna, where he earned a doctorate in theology in 1849.

After his ordination he worked in the Archdiocese of Vienna in the parish of Saint Leopold. He was also a professor of religion in the gymnasium of the Theresian Academy, a preacher in the metropolitan cathedral, and a professor of pastoral theology in the university. He was created Privy chamberlain supernumerary of His Holiness.

Episcopate
Pope Leo XIII appointed him titular bishop of Carre and an Auxiliary Bishop of Vienna on 28 March 1878. He was promoted to the metropolitan see of Vienna on 23 June 1890.

Cardinalate
On 1 June 1891, Pope Leo created him a cardinal priest. He was assigned the titular church of Santa Maria degli Angeli in the consistory of 14 December 1891. He participated in the conclave of 1903 that elected Pope Pius X and refused to issue the veto of Emperor Franz Josef I against Cardinal Rampolla; however, that veto was issued by Cardinal Puzyna. Cardinal Gruscha died in 1911.

References

1820 births
1911 deaths
Archbishops of Vienna
20th-century Austrian cardinals
Cardinals created by Pope Leo XIII
19th-century Austrian cardinals